Percival Edmund "Percy" Manuel (21 February 1909 – 15 August 1983) was an English professional footballer who played as an outside right. He played in both the English Football League and the Canadian National Soccer League throughout his career.

He also represented an Eastern Canada All-Stars team to take on a Scotland XI during Scotland's North American tour of 1935.

References

1909 births
1983 deaths
English footballers
Association football forwards
English Football League players
Oxford City F.C. players
Swindon Town F.C. players
Trowbridge Town F.C. players
Stourbridge F.C. players
Wrexham A.F.C. players